The Way I Feel is an album by American organist John Patton recorded in 1964 and released on the Blue Note label.

Reception

The AllMusic review by Stephen Thomas Erlewine awarded the album 3 stars and stated "There are several fine moments on the record, and Green and Patton are typically enjoyable, but the record overall is a slight disappointment after its two predecessors".

Track listing
All compositions by John Patton
 "The Rock" – 7:29  	
 "The Way I Feel" – 8:38 	
 "Jerry" – 6:45
 "Davene" – 7:25
 "Just ¾" – 6:51

Personnel
"Big" John Patton – organ
Richard Williams – trumpet (1–3, 5)
Fred Jackson – tenor saxophone, baritone saxophone (1–3, 5)
Grant Green – guitar
Ben Dixon – drums

References

Blue Note Records albums
John Patton (musician) albums
1964 albums
Albums recorded at Van Gelder Studio
Albums produced by Alfred Lion